Rudolph Frank Ingerle (14 April 1879 - 20 October 1950) was an American landscape artist of European origin.

He was born in Vienna, Austria to a father from Moravia, now part of the Czech Republic, but moved with his family at the age of 12 to Burlington, Wisconsin, USA and then to Chicago, where he was naturalized in 1895. In Chicago he attended classes at the John Francis Smith Art Academy and also took night classes at the School of the Art Institute of Chicago (SAIC). In the early 1900s he joined with Indiana artist T.C. Steele and others to form the Indiana School of Painting in Brown County.

He made his first trip to the Ozark mountains in 1920 and eventually moved to live and work there, co-founding the Society of Ozark Painters. He painted so many dramatic images of the mountains and mountain life that he became known as the “Painter of the Smokies” and held several one-man shows at prominent museums in the region, such as the Mint Museum in Charlotte and the Hickory Museum of Art in North Carolina. He and his colleagues actively supported the local people in their fight against the damaging activities of the logging companies, campaigning so effectively that in 1934 the U.S. Government established the Great Smoky Mountains National Park.

Ingerle also maintained a studio in Chicago and served as president of the influential Chicago Society of Artists for several years. He was awarded a Logan medal for Sanity in Art in 1938 by the Society for Sanity in Art.

He died in 1950. He had married Marie Vasut in 1904 and had at least one son.

Selected works
 Swappin' Grounds (1928)

References

1879 births
1950 deaths
Landscape painters
19th-century American painters
Austro-Hungarian emigrants to the United States
20th-century American painters